Sigappu Malargal is a 1986 Indian Tamil-language film, directed by S. A. Chandrasekhar. The film stars Suresh and Gayatri.

Plot

Cast 
Suresh
Gayatri
Jaishankar
Sripriya
Chandrasekhar
Charle
Senthil

Soundtrack 

Music was composed by M. S. Viswanathan Lyrics by Vaali.

Reception 
The Indian Express criticised Chandrasekhar's direction and also wrote "The only saving grace of this enormously clichéd film is that Chandrasekharan gives it an unexpected twist or two. But all this is washed away in a flood of cliches". Jayamanmadhan of Kalki wrote there was no yawning from start to end, so he thanked Chandrasekhar.

References

External links 
 

1986 films
1980s Tamil-language films
Films scored by M. S. Viswanathan